GBR-13069 is a psychostimulant and selective dopamine reuptake inhibitor.

See also
 Vanoxerine
 GBR-12783
 GBR-12935
 GBR-13098
 DBL-583

References

Dopamine reuptake inhibitors
1-(2-(Bis(4-fluorophenyl)methoxy)ethyl)piperazines
Stimulants